The 2017 Ironman World Championship was a long distance triathlon competition held on October 14, 2017 in Kailua-Kona, Hawaii that was won by Patrick Lange of Germany and Daniela Ryf of Switzerland. It was the 41st edition of the Ironman World Championship, which has been held annually in Hawaii since 1978. The championship was organized by the World Triathlon Corporation (WTC). For Ryf it was her third consecutive Ironman World Championship win. This was Lange's first championship win and in doing so he set a new overall course record previously set by Craig Alexander in 2011.

Championship results

Men

Women

References

External links
Ironman website

Ironman World Championship
Sports competitions in Hawaii
Ironman
2017 in sports in Hawaii
Triathlon competitions in the United States